Fretwell Branch is a stream in Lewis County in the U.S. state of Missouri.

Fretwell Branch has the name of Leonard and Nancy Ann Fretwell, pioneer citizens. The Fretwells are cited as original owners of the site.

See also
List of rivers of Missouri

References

Rivers of Lewis County, Missouri
Rivers of Missouri